The Polish Jew (French: Le Juif polonais) is a 1931 French historical drama film directed by Jean Kemm and starring Harry Baur, Mady Berry and Simone Mareuil. It is based on the 1867 play of the same name by Alexandre Chatrian and Emile Erckmann.

The film's sets were designed by the art director Jean d'Eaubonne.

Synopsis
In Alsace in the 1830s, an innkeeper and burgomaster is haunted by the memories of a Polish Jew he robbed and murdered fifteen years before.

Cast
 Harry Baur as Mathias
 Mady Berry as Catherine
 Georges La Cressonnière as Christian
 Simone Mareuil as Annette
 Lucien Dayle as Walter
 Geo Laby as 	Richter Fils
 Louis Pré Fils as Muller
 Mlle Rivière as 	Loïs, la servante
 Raymond Gardanne as Franz
 Raymond Turgy as Nicolas
 Jules Maurier as 	Le Juif polonais

References

Bibliography 
 Limbacher, James L. . Haven't I seen you somewhere before?: Remakes, sequels, and series in motion pictures and television, 1896-1978. Pierian Press, 1979.

External links 
 

1931 films
1930s historical drama films
French historical drama films
1930s French-language films
Films directed by Jean Kemm
French films based on plays
Films set in Alsace
Films set in the 1830s
1931 drama films
1930s French films